Such a Little Queen may refer to:

 Such a Little Queen (1914 film), a 1914 silent film starring Mary Pickford
 Such a Little Queen (1921 film), a 1921 silent film starring Constance Binney